Ooperipatellus insignis is a species of velvet worm in the family Peripatopsidae. Females of this species range from 5 mm to 39 mm in length, while males range from 4 mm to 30 mm in length. This species has 14 pairs of legs and is found in Victoria, Australia.

References

Onychophorans of Australasia
Onychophoran species
Animals described in 1890
Taxa named by Arthur Dendy